Beijing Sport University Football Club, commonly known as BSU, is a Chinese professional football club that currently participates in the China League One division under license from the Chinese Football Association (CFA). The team is based in Beijing and their home stadium is the Olympic Sports Center (Beijing) that has a seating capacity of 36,228. Their current majority shareholder is the conglomerate Beijing Enterprises Holdings Limited.

History
Beijing Baxy&Shengshi F.C. was founded in 2004 by former Chinese footballers Guo Weiwei, Wang Tao and Guo Weijian as an amateur football club. By 2009 the club's youth team were considered good enough to take part in professional football and the club entered the third tier of Chinese football at the beginning of the 2009 China League Two season. Within their first professional campaign Wang Tao was their Chairman who brought in Cao Xiandong to manage the team. The players wore white tops, black bottoms, white socks for the home kits and blue tops, white bottoms, dark blue socks for their away kit. After a promising start to the campaign that saw them lead the table within the group stage the club ultimately finished third in the play-off and just missed out of promotion to the second division. After failure to win promotion from the previous season the club decided to take over financially struggling China League One side Beijing Hongdeng and took over their position within the league at the beginning of the 2010 league season. In their first season in the second tier, they were given a 6-point deduction due to Beijing Hongdeng's late payment of wages for Rajko Vidović in the 2007 season.

In 2011, they renamed themselves Beijing Baxy. They finished 15th out of 16 teams in the 2012 season and was supposed to relegate to China League Two; however, they were spared from relegation due to Dalian Shide's dissolution. On 26 February 2013, Croatian manager Goran Tomić was officially announced as the new coach of the club. After signing some high level players such as Stephen Makinwa, Lucian Goian, Ryan Griffiths and Hu Zhaojun, they finished historic high record of 7th place in the 2013 season. In the next year, they had a 21-match-unbeaten (8 wins and 13 draws) start in the 2014 season. They remained the hope of promotion until the last round and eventually finished in 4th place. Goran Tomić won China League One Coach of the Year award in December 2014.

On 25 December 2014, Beijing Enterprises Holdings Limited bought majority shares of the club and the club name was changed into Beijing Enterprises Group. They would also change the club's badge and home kit from all white to blue and red as well as bring in former Beijing Guoan manager Aleksandar Stanojević on 12 January 2015 on a three-year contract with the club.

On 30 December 2016, the team officially sacked Aleksandar Stanojević, and signed Yasen Petrov as their new manager. On 5 June 2017, Beijing Enterprise player, Cheick Tioté died after suffering a heart attack during training at the age of 30. The club retired Tioté's number 24 shirt on 24 June 2017.

On 23 June 2017, in the pre-match media conference, team manager Gao Hongbo announced that team has signed former Everton and Sunderland forward Victor Anichebe as a free agent.

Name history
2004–2010 Beijing Baxy&Shengshi F.C. 北京八喜盛世
2011–2014 Beijing Baxy F.C. 北京八喜
2015–2018 Beijing Enterprises Group F.C. 北京控股
2019–  Beijing Sport University F.C. 北京北体大

Grounds
The club's home ground was the Chaoyang Sports Centre which is located on Yaojiayuan Road No. 77 in the Chaoyang District. The stadium was used during the 2008 Beijing Olympics and the grounds also incorporate a golf driving range, equestrian shop, baseball venue, indoor tennis, and training pitches. Baxy do not train at this venue, but amateur football club Forbidden City Football Club often play weekend matches at the pitches located directly behind the main stadium. They moved their new home stadium to Olympic Sports Centre (Beijing) in 2015.

Players

Current squad

Retired numbers

24 –  Cheick Tioté, Midfielder, 2017 posthumous. The number was retired in June 2017.

Coaching staff

Managerial history
Only League matches are counted.

Results
All-time League Rankings

As of the end of 2019 season.

 in group stage 6-point deduction for late payment of wages

Key
<div>

 Pld = Played
 W = Games won
 D = Games drawn
 L = Games lost
 F = Goals for
 A = Goals against
 Pts = Points
 Pos = Final position

 DNQ = Did Not Qualify
 DNE = Did Not Enter
 NH = Not Held
- = Does Not Exist
 R1 = Round 1
 R2 = Round 2
 R3 = Round 3
 R4 = Round 4

 F = Final
 SF = Semi-finals
 QF = Quarter-finals
 R16 = Round of 16
 Group = Group stage
 GS2 = Second Group stage
 QR1 = First Qualifying Round
 QR2 = Second Qualifying Round
 QR3 = Third Qualifying Round

Notable players
Had international caps for their respective countries.

Africa
 Daniel Quaye
 Cheick Tioté
 Victor Anichebe
 Stephen Makinwa
 Momar N'Diaye

Asia
 Ryan Griffiths
 Hu Zhaojun
 Lu Jiang
 Lü Peng
 Yan Xiangchuang
 Yu Tao
 Chen Hao-wei
 Wen Chih-hao
 Godfred Karikari

Europe
 Rubin Okotie
 Lucian Goian
 Danko Lazović

See also 
 Beijing Sport University

References

External links
 Official website 

Beijing Sport University F.C.
Association football clubs established in 2004
2004 establishments in China
Football clubs in Beijing